Michael Shipley may refer to:

Mike Shipley (1956–2013), Australian mix engineer
Michael Shipley (screenwriter), television writer and producer